Lacertaspis is a genus of skinks endemic to Central Africa.

Species
The following five species are recognized.

Lacertaspis chriswildi ( & , 1996) – Chris Wild's snake-eyed skink
Lacertaspis gemmiventris (Sjöstedt, 1897) – Sjostedt's five-toed skink
Lacertaspis lepesmei (Angel, 1940) – Angel's five-toed skink
Lacertaspis reichenowii (W. Peters, 1874)
Lacertaspis rohdei (L. Müller, 1910) – Gaboon lidless skink

Nota bene: A binomial authority in parentheses indicates that the species was originally described in a genus other than Lacertaspis.

References

Further reading
  (1975). "La différentiation dans le genre Panaspis Cope (Reptilia, Scincidae)". Bull. Soc. neuchâtel. Sci. Nat. 98: 5–16. (Lacertaspis'', new genus). (in French).

 
Lizard genera
Skinks of Africa
Taxa named by Jean-Luc Perret